Jose Bonifacio Lafayette de Andrada (Barbacena, May 1, 1904 – Belo Horizonte, February 18, 1986) was a Brazilian lawyer and politician signing the "Manifesto dos Mineiros", constituent state in 1935 and a member of the National Constituent Assembly of 1946, Congressman eight federal mandates and President of the Chamber of Deputies (1968–1970).

References

1904 births
1986 deaths
People from Barbacena
Presidents of the Chamber of Deputies (Brazil)
Members of the Chamber of Deputies (Brazil) from Minas Gerais
20th-century Brazilian lawyers